William Lane Milligan (1795–1851) was a British military surgeon. He became an early resident of the Swan River Colony in Western Australia.

Early life
Milligan was born on 1 February 1795 in Cavan, Ireland. He received a Licentiate of Midwifery and a Doctor of Medicine from the University of Edinburgh.

Career
He was a Fellow of the Royal College of Physicians of London and served as a military surgeon. He originally joined the 16th Regiment of the British Army, but he transferred to the 63rd Regiment on 8 February 1827.

Some records claim that Milligan emigrated to Western Australia with his wife on James Stirling's expedition arriving aboard  on 8 June 1829. Others claim that he emigrated to Western Australia with his wife, child and a nephew, arriving aboard  on 30 January 1830.

The painting "The Foundation of Perth 1829" shows Milligan as being present at the foundation of Perth on 12 August 1829. However, if he only arrived in Perth on 30 January 1830, more than five months after the foundation ceremony, he cannot have been present.

Milligan opened the first hospital in the colony in June 1830 and served as its superintendent.

He was the original owner of the land at the southern end of Milligan Street, Perth, which was named after him. He moved to Fremantle in 1834, but was then transferred to India and left on Merope on 18 April 1834.  He was Staff Surgeon at Poonamallee, near Madras (Chennai) in 1837.

In 1837 Milligan published a paper in the Madras Journal of Literature and Science titled "Some Account of the New Colony of Western Australia".

Milligan retired from the army in 1847 due to ill health, and lived in Nuneaton, England.

Personal life
He married Elizabeth Sybil Lane in 1823. They had four children: Anna, William, Harriet, Maria. The last three were born in the colony; William lived only four days.

Death
He died on 2 September 1851 in London, England.

References

1795 births
1851 deaths
People from County Cavan
Settlers of Western Australia
People from Perth, Western Australia
Alumni of the University of Edinburgh
Fellows of the Royal College of Physicians
Australian surgeons